Sultan Muzaffar Shah ibni Almarhum Sultan Mahmud Shah (died 1540) was the sixth Sultan of Pahang who reigned from 1530–1540. He succeeded on the death of his father, Mahmud Shah in 1530. Known as Raja Muzaffar before his succession, he was the eldest son of the fifth Sultan of Pahang, Mahmud Shah by his first wife, Raja Putri Olah binti al-Marhum Sultan Ahmad.

Reign
Sultan Muzaffar was enthroned at Sayong Pinang, by his second cousin, Alauddin Riayat Shah II of Johor. At the beginning of his reign, a leader of Orang Laut named Patih Ludang from Singapore whom earlier had quarrelled with Sang Setia, a Hulubalang from Johor , seek protection in Pahang with his followers. Patih Ludang was killed by Sang Setia in the court of Johor while escorting Sultan Muzaffar in his enthronement ceremony. The incident was ultimately settled amicably without further bloodshed between both states.

Contrary to the reign of his father that saw numerous armed conflicts with the Portuguese Malacca, Sultan Muzaffar's reign was characterised by a relative peace and stability. It was during his reign, a Portuguese merchant who goes under the name Tome Lobo, had permanent establishment in the Pahang capital. This was based on the account of a Portuguese explorer Fernão Mendes Pinto who journeyed to Pahang with a merchant vessel in 1540.

However, misfortune overtook the Portuguese merchants when they were caught in an uproar in the capital, following the murder of the Sultan A ruthless mob attacked their resident and seized their goods which amounted fifty thousand ducats  in gold and precious stone alone. The Portuguese managed to escape and proceeded to Pattani. They made representations to the King of Pattani, and he gave instant permission to take reprisals by attacking Pahang boats in the Kelantan River, then a province of Pattani, and to recover goods to the value what had been lost. The Portuguese took the king at his word, fitted out an expedition, and proceeded to the Kelantan River where they attacked and captured three junks owned by Pahang merchants, killing seventy four of the enemy, with a loss of only three of their men.

Death
The Sultan, who, according to Pinto, was killed in 1540 appears to have been Sultan Muzaffar.  He was killed by Khoja Zainal, a wealthy merchant who was also a leader of the Bruneian envoy that resided in Pekan, for committing adultery with his wife.  Sultan Muzaffar was posthumously styled Marhum di Tengah ('the late ruler who was buried in the centre') after his death and was succeeded by his younger brother, Raja Zainal.

References

Bibliography
 
 
 
 
 

1540 deaths
Sultans of Pahang
16th-century monarchs in Asia
16th-century murdered monarchs
Murder in 1540